Samuel Poulin is a Canadian politician, who was elected to the National Assembly of Quebec in the 2018 provincial election. He represents the electoral district of Beauce-Sud as a member of the Coalition Avenir Québec.

References

Living people
Coalition Avenir Québec MNAs
People from Saint-Georges, Quebec
Black Canadian politicians
Moroccan emigrants to Canada
21st-century Canadian politicians
Year of birth missing (living people)